Mirjana Božović (born 1987) was the first official "Miss Serbia," in 2007. She represented Serbia in Miss World 2007 in Sanya, China. She studied Civil Engineering with the intention of having her own engineering company.

In 2010, Božović appeared on the reality TV show Serbian Farm.

References

External links
 Famtic Photo Gallery of Mirjana Božović

Miss World 2007 delegates
Miss Serbia winners
Serbian female models
1987 births
Living people
Serbian beauty pageant winners